Todd Layne Hammel (born December 7, 1966) is a retired professional arena football player who played for 10 teams since his Arena Football League (AFL) career began in 1992. He is the great grandson of Oklahoma Indian Chief Quana Parker and a member of the Comanche tribe. He is a distant relative of QB Sam Bradford.

High school career
Hammel attended Durant High School in Durant, Oklahoma, and was a four sport letterman in football, basketball, baseball, and track. As a junior, he helped lead his football team to the 1983-84 Class 3-A State Championship.  He also helped lead the Lions in basketball to a District Championship. Hammel graduated from Durant High School in 1985.

College career
Hammel played college football for the Stephen F. Austin Lumberjacks. As a senior, he helped lead his team to a 9–1–1 regular season record, the No. 3 ranking in final Division I-AA poll, and a berth in the 1989 NCAA Division I-AA Football Championship Game. Hammel was named a first team All-Conference pick and the Southland Conference Offensive Player of the Year. He finished his college career with 8,631 passing yards and 65 touchdowns. He left Stephen F. Austin as the school's all-time leader in passing attempts, completions, yards, touchdowns, and total yardage.

Professional career
He was selected by the Tampa Bay Buccaneers in the 12th round of the 1990 NFL Draft. In 1991, he played for the New York/New Jersey Knights in the World League of American Football.

Hammel's long football career includes stints with more than a dozen different AFL teams.
 1992-1993 - Dallas Texans
 1994 - Fort Worth Cavalry
 1995-1999 - Milwaukee Mustangs
 2000 - Florida Bobcats
 2001 - Houston Thunderbears
 2002 - Grand Rapids Rampage
 2003 - Las Vegas Gladiators
 2004 - Philadelphia Soul
 2005 - Chicago Rush
 2006 - Colorado Crush
 2009 - Milwaukee Iron
 2010 - Jacksonville Sharks
 2010 - Chicago Rush
 2011 - Utah Blaze

He spent the 2009 season playing for the Milwaukee Iron of the Arena Football 2 AF2. In 2010, at age 43 he played for the Jacksonville Sharks and Chicago Rush. He was signed to the Utah Blaze on July 7, 2011. He has a twin brother, Tad. Todd is married to Tanna Bryant and they currently reside in McKinney, Texas.

Notes

External links
 Todd Hammel at ArenaFan Online

1966 births
Living people
People from Durant, Oklahoma
Players of American football from Oklahoma
American football quarterbacks
Stephen F. Austin Lumberjacks football players
New York/New Jersey Knights players
Dallas Texans (Arena) players
Fort Worth Cavalry players
Milwaukee Mustangs (1994–2001) players
Florida Bobcats players
Houston ThunderBears players
Grand Rapids Rampage players
Las Vegas Gladiators players
Philadelphia Soul players
Chicago Rush players
Colorado Crush players
Utah Blaze players
Milwaukee Iron players